The Adunicates were a small Gallic tribe dwelling in the upper Durance valley during the Roman era.

Name 
They are mentioned as Adunicates by Pliny (1st c. AD).

The etymology of the name is unclear. If Celtic, it may be interpreted as a haplology (loss of syllable) of Gaulish *Andedunicates, based on the intensifying prefix ande-. In this view, it could be compared to the personal names Andedunis and Atedunus ('big fort').

Geography 
The Adunicates lived in the upper Durance valley. They are mentioned as living near the Suetrii and the Quariates, north of the Oxybii and Ligauni.

References

Primary sources

Bibliography 

Historical Celtic peoples
Gauls
Tribes of pre-Roman Gaul